The Patriarchal Exarchate in South-East Asia (PESEA) is an exarchate created by the Russian Orthodox Church (ROC) on 28 December 2018.

The primate of the PESEA is Metropolitan Sergius (Chashin) who holds the title of "Metropolitan of Singapore and South-East Asia".

History

Background 
Eastern Orthodoxy initially developed in Korea in connection with the activities of the Korean spiritual mission of the Russian Orthodox Church in the early 20th century. After the revolution of 1917, in conditions of turmoil and unprecedented dispersion of the flock of the Russian Orthodox Church in different countries of the world, the first Russian parishes appeared in Southeast Asia: in the Philippines and in the Dutch East Indies (now Indonesia), which at that time were subordinate to the Russian Orthodox Church Outside Russia. Missionary activity at that time was not carried out, so the departure of Russian refugees from Southeast Asia led to the disappearance of these parishes. Russian spiritual mission in South Korea in 1955 was transferred to the Patriarchate of Constantinople.

After the collapse of the Soviet Union, immigrants from the former Soviet Union and other traditionally Orthodox countries began to arrive in Southeast Asia. However, there were practically no Eastern Orthodox parishes on this area, and the Moscow Patriarchate did not have it at all. Gradually the situation began to change. In 1999, hegumen Oleg (Cherepanin) founded the St. Nicholas parish in Bangkok. In 2001, hegumen Oleg was appointed head of the then established Representation of The Russian Orthodox Church in the Kingdom of Thailand, which was also responsible for Laos and Cambodia. After the registration of the Russian Orthodox Church in Thailand in 2008, it became possible to open parishes across the country. As of 2018, there were 10, and all of them had permanent churches built. In addition, a theological college was built and opened on the island of Phuket to train people of South-East Asia who converted to Orthodoxy. Three parishes in Cambodia were established, with churches were built for two of them. Since 2014, the Russian Orthodox mission in the Philippines began to develop. In 2018, there were 16 parishes of the Moscow Patriarchate in the Philippines, mainly on the island of Mindanao. Two Russian Orthodox communities were created in Vietnam, one in Vũng Tàu (since 2002) and the other in Hanoi (since 2016). In Indonesia, the parishes of the Moscow Patriarchate were opened in Jakarta, Surabaya and Bali.

On October 21, 2016, the Holy Synod of the Russian Orthodox Church appointed Bishop Sergius (Chashin) of Solnechnogorsk as the administrator for the parishes of the Moscow Patriarchate in Southeast and East Asia. He took care of parishes in Cambodia, Indonesia, Laos, Malaysia, Singapore, the Philippines, the DPRK, the Republic of Korea and Viet Nam. A separate structure was formed for Thailand: the Patriarchal Parishes in Thailand, subordinated directly to the Patriarch of Moscow and all Rus'.

Creation of the PESEA 

On 28 December 2018, in response to the Ecumenical Patriarchate's actions in Ukraine, the Holy Synod of the Russian Orthodox Church decided to create "a Patriarchal Exarchate in Western Europe with the center in Paris", as well as "a Patriarchal Exarchate in South-East Asia [PESEA] with the center in Singapore." The "sphere of pastoral responsibility" of the PESEA is Singapore, Vietnam, Indonesia, Cambodia, North Korea, South Korea, Laos, Malaysia, the Myanmar, the Philippines, and Thailand. On the same day, in an interview with Russia-24 channel, Metropolitan Hilarion, spokesman of the ROC, declared the ROC "will now act as if they [Constantinople] do not exist at all because our purpose is missionary, our task is to educate, we are creating these structures for ministerial care about our flock, there can be no such deterring factors here", and that the ROC will take charge of the Eastern Orthodox faithfuls of its diaspora instead of the Ecumenical Patriarchate.

Archbishop Sergius (Chashin), was appointed as primate of the newly created PESEA, with the title "of Singapore and Southeast Asia". On 7 January 2019, during the evening service in the Church of Christ the Savior in Moscow, Patriarch Kirill elevated Archbishop Sergius (Chashin) to the rank of Metropolitan in connection with the latter's appointment as exarch of the PESEA.

In August 2019, Metropolitan Sergius of Singapore and Southeast Asia said that "today we speak not of the establishment of a 'parallel Church' but of the restoration of the ecclesiastical mission of the Russian Orthodox Church. It is conditioned by the need to provide pastoral care to our compatriots in all parts of the globe including Asia, as well as by the impossibility of our flock at present to partake of the Mysteries in the Church of Constantinople as it has entered into communion with schismatics and invaded the canonical bounds of the Moscow Patriarchate in Ukraine"

Structure 
Since 26 February 2019, the exarchate is divided in four dioceses:

Diocese of Singapore (comprising Singapore, Indonesia, Malaysia, East Timor and Papua New Guinea), always headed by the primate of the PESEA
 Diocese of Korea (comprising North and South Korea)
 Diocese of Thailand (comprising Cambodia, Laos, Thailand and the Myanmar)
 Diocese of Philippines and Vietnam (comprising the Philippines and Vietnam)

On the same day, Metropolitan Sergius (Chashin) was appointed as ruling bishop of the Singapore diocese, as well as locum tenens of the other 3 dioceses.

On 4 April 2019 Archbishop Theophanes was appointed by the Holy Synod as primate of the diocese of Korea.

Ruling bishops 

 Sergius (Chashin) (28 December 2018 -)

See also 

 Eastern Orthodox Metropolitanate of Hong Kong and Southeast Asia – a diocese of the Ecumenical Patriarchate of Constantinople
Philippine Orthodox Church (Moscow Patriarchate) – a church within the PESEA
Patriarchal Exarchate in Western Europe (Moscow Patriarchate) – exarchate of the Russian Orthodox Church created for the same reasons and during the same synod

References

External links 

 Information about the PESEA on the official website of the ROC
 Korean Eparchy (Moscow Patriarchate) – a church within the PESEA
 Orthodox Christian Church of Cambodia (Moscow Patriarchate) – a church within the PESEA
 Orthodox Church in Thailand (Moscow Patriarchate) – a church within the PESEA
 Philippines and Vietnam Diocese (Moscow Patriarchate) – a church within the PESEA

Further reading 

Eastern Orthodox Church bodies in Asia
2018 establishments in Asia
Christian organizations established in 2018
Eastern Orthodoxy in Singapore
Eastern Orthodoxy in North Korea
Eastern Orthodoxy in the Philippines
Exarchates of the Russian Orthodox Church
Eastern Orthodox dioceses in Asia